Macrocera parva  is a Palearctic  species of  'fungus gnat' in the family Keroplatidae.Larvae of species in this genus have been reared from a range of situations including clumps of turf, rotting wood and cave walls and are thought to be  predaceous.

References

External links
Images representing  Macrocera parva  at BOLD

Keroplatidae
Insects described in 1914